Dorat Road is a designated state route in the Northern Territory of Australia providing an alternative route to the Stuart Highway from Adelaide River and rejoining north of Hayes Creek, a distance of .

Dorat Road was originally constructed during World War II as part of the original Stuart Highway alignment, which was later bypassed owing to steep climbs and tight curves along the route. In the 1960s most bridges and floodways were resurfaced, and the entire length is currently sealed. In 1987 the current name was gazetted, taken from the acronym D.O.R.A.T. (Darwin Overland Road Authorities Transport), an organisation formed in 1942 by state transport authorities of Victoria, South Australia and New South Wales to transport materials used in the construction of the Stuart Highway from the then railhead at Alice Springs. With the adoption of a state route numbering system of rural roads maintained by the Northern Territory Government in the same year, Dorat Road was designated and signposted as state route 23.

See also

References

Roads in the Northern Territory